Khirbet Tibnah (also Tibneh), is located on the West Bank, between the villages Deir Nidham and Nabi Salih.

History

Antiquity
Schürer wrote in the 1880s that Thamna – a city within the district of Diospolis (=Lydda) and which served once as a toparchy (administrative city) during the Roman period – is to be identified with the biblical city of Timnath-serah, now known as the ruin (khirba in Arabic) of Tibnah (Tibneh) in Samaria. He also quoted Eusebius who wrote at the beginning of the 4th century that the tomb of Joshua was in his time still visited at a place near the village.

Roman and Byzantine periods
Ceramics from the late Roman and the Byzantine eras have been found here  (at grid 1603/1573).

Crusader period
Khirbet Tibnah is one of the places  suggested identified with the Crusader Tyberie.

Ottoman period

In 1596, the Tibnah (Tibya) site was listed as village in the nahiya Quds, in the administrative district Liwā` of Jerusalem, in a tax ledger of the "countries of Syria" (wilāyat aš-Šām) and which lands were then under Ottoman rule. During that year, Tibna was inhabited by 20 family heads, all Muslim. The Ottoman authority levied a 33.3% taxation on agricultural products produced by the villagers (primarily on wheat, barley, and olives), besides a marriage tax and supplement tax on goats and beehives. Total revenues accruing from the village of Tibna for that year amounted to 3700 akçe.

Charles William Wilson, who travelled through Palestine in 1866, reported a cemetery containing nine tombs south of the town, which was once capital of the surrounding district: one of these tombs was large, with a portico supported on piers of rock with very simple capitals. One of the piers was apparently destroyed between 1866 and 1873. There were niches for over 200 lamps at the tomb entrance. Inside was a chamber with fourteen graves, or kokhim], with a passage leading into an inner chamber containing one grave. He also wrote about a 40 foot high oak tree near the tomb, known as Sheikh et-Teim, and a village about 3 miles to the east, called Kefr Ishu'a, or Joshua's Village.

Both in 1863 and in 1870 Guérin visited, and described several ruins.
Khirbet Tibnah is described in 1882 as a tell overlooking a deep valley (Wady Reiya) on the north and the ancient Roman road to the south. A cemetery was situated on a flat hill nearby, and to the northwest, the spring of Ein Tibnah emerged from a rocky channel. On the southwest was an oak tree some 30 or 40 feet high, and two wells, one of them dry. West of the tree were traces of ruins believed to be those of an Arab village.

Mandate period
The village was not inhabited in the late mandatory period.

See also
Khirbet et-Tibbaneh aka Timnah of Judah, site in the Judaean Mountains

References

Bibliography

 
 (p. 367)

External links
Tibneh, Biblewalks
 Survey of Western Palestine, 1880 Map, Map 14: IAA, Wikimedia commons Tibneh (Sheikh et Teim)

Former populated places in Southwest Asia
Archaeological sites in the West Bank
Biblical geography
Hebrew Bible cities
Tells (archaeology)